Tyulkino is a rural locality (a settlement) in Solikamsky District, Perm Krai, Russia. The population was 1,331 as of 2010. There are 31 streets.

Geography 
Tyulkino is located 29 km northwest of Solikamsk (the district's administrative centre) by road. Verkhneye Moshevo is the nearest rural locality.

References 

Rural localities in Solikamsky District